Hélène Harbec (born 1946) is a Canadian writer.

She was born in Saint-Jean-sur-Richelieu, Quebec and was educated at Laval University. Harbec has lived in Moncton, New Brunswick since 1970.

She published poems in several literary magazines including Éloizes, Le Sabord and Arcade belles interurbaines. In 1986, she published L'été avant la mort, written with France Daigle. This was followed by a collection of poems Le cahier des absences et de la décision in 1991 and a novel L'orgueilleuse in 1998. In 2002, she published her second poetry collection Va, which was awarded the Prix Antonine-Maillet-Acadie-Vie. Several of her poems appeared in a special issue of Dalhousie French Studies in 2003 entitled Auteures acadiennes: création et critique. She published a collection of poems Le tracteur céleste in 2005.

Selected works 
 Les voiliers blancs, novel (2004)
 Le cahier des absences et de la décision, poetry (2009)
 Chambre 503, fiction (2009)

References 

1946 births
Living people
Canadian novelists in French
Canadian poets in French
Canadian women non-fiction writers
Acadian people
Canadian women journalists
Canadian women poets
Canadian women novelists
Journalists from New Brunswick
Journalists from Quebec
Université Laval alumni
People from Saint-Jean-sur-Richelieu
Writers from Moncton
Writers from Quebec
20th-century Canadian non-fiction writers
21st-century Canadian non-fiction writers
20th-century Canadian women writers
21st-century Canadian women writers